The Mercedes-AMG GT (C190 / R190) is a grand tourer produced in coupé and roadster bodystyles by German automobile manufacturer Mercedes-AMG. After the SLS AMG, it is the second sports car developed entirely in-house by Mercedes-AMG. The Mercedes-AMG GT went on sale in two variants (GT and GT S) in March 2015, while a GT3 racing variant of the car was introduced in 2015. A high performance variant called the GT R was introduced in 2016. A GT4 racing variant, targeted at semi-professional drivers and based on the GT R variant, was introduced in 2017. Recently, a new variant called the AMG GT Black Series has been released. All variants are assembled at the Mercedes-Benz plant in Sindelfingen, Germany.

On 28 October 2021, Mercedes-Benz announced the new Mercedes-AMG R232 SL-Class as the direct successor for the roadster version.

History

The interior of the Mercedes-AMG GT was previewed on 16 April 2014. The GT generates  of torque, and the GT S generates  of torque.

Shortly after its introduction, Mercedes-AMG CEO at the time, Tobias Moers promised a Black Series variant of the Mercedes-AMG GT. The new high performance variant was called the AMG GT R.

F1 Safety Car 

The GT S was the Formula 1 safety car for the 2015, 2016 and 2017 seasons, having made its debut in that role at the 2015 Australian Grand Prix. The GT R was used as F1's safety car from 2018 to 2022. Since 2022, the GT R was replaced by the Black Series.

2017 facelift 

The Mercedes-AMG family was given a facelift in 2017, along with the introduction of the GT C roadster variant and the Edition 50 model, which is a limited-edition derivative of the GT C variant. The key improvements made as part of the facelift include increased power output from the M178 engine for the GT and GT S variants (10 kW and 9 kW respectively) and the inclusion of the 'Panamericana' grille from the GT3, GT4 and GT R variants as standard equipment for all variants.

Features
The GT's exterior design was kept similar to that of the preceding SLS AMG. It features the wide wheel arches, lower bodywork, and fastback sloping roofline of the SLS AMG, but uses conventional forward-opening doors instead of the iconic gullwing style pioneered by the 300 SL in the 1950s. The large bonnet and slim windscreen have been retained. The vehicle structure is made up of 93% aluminium, with the front module base made up of magnesium. The exterior lead designer was Mark Fetherston, whose previous works include the W176 A-Class, the CLA-Class, and SLS AMG. The interior, designed by Jan Kaul, features a large centre console and decorative elements in a leather and carbon polymer design. The trunk offers room for a medium-sized suitcase.

Specifications and performance

The GT uses a front mid-engine, rear-wheel-drive layout, with the engine positioned inside of the vehicle's wheelbase. The spaceframe chassis and body are made out of aluminium alloys, while the trunk lid is made of steel and the hood is made of magnesium. The suspension system is a double wishbone unit at the front and rear, with forged aluminium wishbones and hub carriers.

The car is powered by a 4.0-litre M178 twin-turbocharged V8 engine. The engine is in "hot inside V" configuration—with exhaust manifolds and turbochargers inside the cylinder banks to reduce turbo lag—and uses dry-sump lubrication. Power is sent to the rear wheels through a seven-speed AMG SPEEDSHIFT dual-clutch transmission; the GT S variant employs an electronically controlled mechanical limited-slip differential.

Variants

Mercedes-AMG GT (2015–2021)

The GT is the entry level variant of the Mercedes-AMG GT family. Keyless-Go is also an optional feature, as opposed to standard equipment. The GT is equipped with 19-inch wheels at the front and rear.

Mercedes-AMG GT S (2015–2020)

The GT S is a more highly equipped variant of the Mercedes-AMG GT. The key mechanical differences the GT S gains over the GT include an electronically controlled limited-slip differential, "Race Mode" and "Race Start" mode settings in the AMG Dynamic Select adaptive drivetrain system, AMG Ride Control adaptive suspensive system, an AMG Performance Exhaust System with dynamic flaps, and a lithium-ion battery. Keyless-Go is standard equipment, as is a staggered set of wheels (19-inch at the front, 20-inch at the rear).

Mercedes-AMG GT C (2017–2021)
The GT C is a performance oriented variant of the Mercedes-AMG GT. While the GT C retains the key mechanical differences the GT S gains over the GT, it also has a wider body and active rear steering, which the GT S does not have (even as options). In the United States, the Lane Tracking and AMG Dynamic Plus option packages are standard equipment on the GT C.

A limited-edition model, the Edition 50, was released as part of the debut of the GT C variant at the 2017 Detroit Auto Show. The Edition 50 features: a choice of two shades of matte paint known as designo Graphite Grey Magno and designo Cashmere White Magno; black chrome exterior trim, headlight surrounds and forged / cross-spoke wheels; a two-tone silver pearl or black against grey quilted-leather interior which features a micro-suede wrapped steering wheel; and, "Edition 50" and "1 of 500" lettering on the steering wheel bezel and 12 o'clock mark in silver pearl. In the United States, the Edition 50 is limited in production to 50 coupes and 50 roadsters. Globally, the Edition 50 is limited to 500 units, which explains the "1 of 500" on the steering wheel.

Mercedes-AMG GT R (2017–2021)

The GT R is a high-performance variant of the Mercedes-AMG GT and was introduced at the Goodwood Festival of Speed on 24 June 2016.

While the GT R retains the key mechanical differences the GT C gains over the GT S, it also gains manually adjustable coilover springs (in conjunction with the AMG Ride Control suspension of the base models), an active underbody fairing, a manually adjustable rear wing, and a 9-mode AMG Traction Control system. As befitting of a high-performance variant, the GT R loses Keyless-Go, the integrated garage-door opener, the heated and power-folding side mirrors, the auto-dimming interior and exterior mirrors and reverts to the basic light-weight 4-speaker audio system that the GT comes with, but these features can still be added as options.

When it was launched, the GT R had several cosmetic changes compared with the standard car, notably the vertical slats in the front grille, an adjustable rear wing, new front air intakes and new front and rear diffusers. The styling of the GT R is more comparable to that of the AMG GT3 race car. However, the base GT variant gained several of these cosmetic changes as part of a mild facelift in the 2017 model year. The GT R went on sale in November 2016, with deliveries beginning in 2017. For the 2018 Formula One World Championship, the GT R became the official Formula 1 safety car. During the 2020 Tuscan Grand Prix, the Safety Car ran a red livery rather than the traditional silver to commemorate Scuderia Ferrari's 1,000th Grand Prix start. For the 2021 F1 season, the GT R Safety Car permanently wears a red livery (along with the Mercedes F1 Team's sponsor CrowdStrike) rather than the traditional silver to increase the chances of drivers seeing the Safety Car in poor visibility. It will also share the role with the Aston Martin Vantage.

It completed a lap of the Nürburgring Nordschleife track in 7:10.92, in a test conducted by German magazine Sport Auto. making it the 5th fastest lap time for a road-legal production vehicle around the track at the time.

A roadster version was introduced in March 2019 and would be limited to 750 units. It was discontinued in 2021 when the Black Edition was released which it replaced.

Mercedes-AMG GT R Pro (2019–2020)

Mercedes-AMG introduced the GT R Pro at the 2018 Los Angeles Auto Show. The GT R Pro is a more track focused variant of the AMG GT line up and based on the GT R. This variant would be limited for 750 units worldwide with a starting price tag of USD $200,645.

New upgrades includes, new manually adjustable coil-over suspension setup, lightweight anti-roll bars, electronically controlled dynamic engine and transmission mounts, GT R's optional carbon-fiber roof and carbon ceramic brakes were became standard, new carbon-fibre bucket seats, lightweight forged wheels 19-inch on front and 20-inch on rear which were exclusive for the GT R Pro, same Michelin Pilot Sport Cup 2 semi-slick tires which were also used in the GT R, new carbon-fibre braced active aerodynamic front splitter and canards, new front fenders with GT3 inspired vents, new rear diffuser with canards, new side skirts, updated rear wing with a small gurney for increase downforce while reducing weight.

Interior upgrades includes, a 10.25-inch digital instrument binnacle and infotainment system, a Burmester surround sound system, keyless go and parking assist. On exterior, new racing stripes offered in Gloss Light Green when combined with the Selenite Gray Magno color exterior, or stripes in Matte Dark Gray with all other exterior colors. The unique accent stripes can also offered for the GT R Pro.

For the GT R Pro, Mercedes-AMG also offered a optional track package which adds a full steel roll-cage, four-point harnesses and a 2 kg fire extinguisher.

In November 2018, Mercedes-AMG conducted a test at Nürburgring Nordschleife for the new GT R Pro, and the car completed a lap time, driven by Maro Engel, set a lap time of 7:04.632 minutes around the track. Making it the 8th fastest lap time for a road-legal production vehicle around the track at the time.

Mercedes-AMG GT and GT C Roadster (2017–2021)

The GT and GT C roadsters are the roadster versions of the GT and GT C coupés, and were announced shortly after the introduction of the GT R variant. Both variants made their debut at the 2016 Paris Motor Show. The GT and GT C roadsters utilise the active air management system found on the GT R variant to help with cooling and airflow performance. The GT C roadster retains the wider bodywork of the GT C coupé, and the GT roadster has a slightly higher first and lower seventh gear with a longer final drive compared to the GT coupé. The GT C roadster, like the GT C coupé, has a limited "Edition 50" model, celebrating AMG's 50 years of existence.

2021 Mercedes-AMG GT Dark Night Edition 
Mercedes-AMG official announced that its AMG GT Black Series and AMG GT Dark night officially listed special edition models, Mercedes-AMG GT models launched a total of 2, The prices are 3,688,800 ($576,612) and 1,468,800 yuan ($229,594).

Mercedes-AMG GT Black Series (2021) 

The GT Black Series is a high-performance variant of the Mercedes-AMG GT and was officially revealed on Mercedes-AMG's YouTube channel on 9 July 2020. Referred to as the M178 LS2, the engine has a slightly higher redline at 7,200 rpm compared to the GT R's 7,000 rpm, and uses a flat-plane crankshaft instead of a cross-plane crankshaft, turning out in different firing order. Additionally, the M178 LS2 uses a larger compressor wheel, resulting in an increase in boost from the GT R's 19.6 psi to 24.6 psi.

The suspension is unique, with a carbon-fibre anti-roll bar with two adjustment settings for the front axle, and an iron anti-roll bar with three adjustment settings for the rear axle. Like previous Black Series vehicles, the camber is manually adjustable for both the front and rear axles. Handling has been improved with carbon-fibre panels at the front and rear, as well as carbon-ceramic brake rotors and Black Series specific brake pads. The Michelin Pilot Cup 2 R tires are specific to the car, and are available in M01A soft and M02 hard compounds.

Carbon-fibre is used extensively for most of the body, including the hood, roof, hatch and underbody. The exterior gains an enlarged grille, based on the Mercedes-AMG GT3, large air outlets on the hood, manually adjustable front splitter, and upgraded rear wing as part of a major aerodynamic kit. The interior features standard AMG performance bucket seats, and uses microfiber for the steering wheel, door and instrument panels.

On 4 November 2020, The Mercedes-AMG GT Black Series recorded a lap time of 6:43.616 with driver Maro Engel behind the wheel at the Nürburgring Nordschleife, making it the fastest lap time ever recorded for a road-legal production vehicle around the track at the time.

Mercedes-AMG GT Track Series (2023–present)

Mercedes-AMG GT3 Edition 55 (2023–present) 

Only 5 pieces. €625k.

Motorsport

In March 2015, Mercedes-AMG presented the AMG GT3, a race version of the GT, at the Geneva Motor Show, which employs the M159  V8 naturally aspirated engine also used in the SLS AMG GT3. It consists largely of carbon-fiber-reinforced polymer to decrease the vehicle's weight to under  to comply with FIA regulations for races.
In 2016, AKKA ASP, Black Falcon, HTP Motorsport and Zakspeed compete in the Blancpain Endurance Series. Zakspeed also competes in the ADAC GT Masters. They claimed a 1-2-3-4 and 6 at the 24 Hours Nürburgring.

In the 2016 Super GT GT300 class, the AMG GT3s made their Super GT debut with Goodsmile Racing with Team UKYO, the number 11 GAINER team, LEON Racing, and Rn-sports opting to use the AMG GT3s in favor of the SLS AMG GT3s that they used in the previous season. Two Mercedes customer teams, R'Qs Motor Sports and Arnage Racing, opted to continue using the SLS AMG GT3s. Both of them would switch to AMG GT3s during the 2018 season, switching from SLS AMG GT3 and Ferrari 488 GT3 respectively.

New Zealand born driver Craig Baird gave the new AMG GT3 its first race win anywhere when he took out race 1 of round 2 of the 2016 Australian GT Championship at the Melbourne Grand Prix Circuit on 17 March 2016. The round was held as a support race to the 2016 Australian Grand Prix.

Riley Technologies entered two customer AMG GT3s in the 2017 IMSA SportsCar Championship GTD class. One of the teams cars finished 3rd in class and 20th outright at the 2017 24 Hours of Daytona before going on to win the GTD class and finish 16th outright in the 2017 12 Hours of Sebring.

A GT4 version of the Mercedes-AMG GT was presented at the 2017 24 Hours of Spa. This customer racing car is based on the GT R road version and it made its debut in the ROWE 6 Stunden ADAC Ruhr-Pokal-Rennen race, the fifth round of the 2017 VLN season.

As of June 2019, a total of 130 GT3 cars were sold.

An updated version of the GT3 was introduced at the 24 Hours of Nürburgring in June 2019 for the 2020 season of the FIA GT3 race. New technologies include an automatic data logger and analysis system, a function to automatically start the engine when the car is lowered from its in-built air jacks along with new brake and traction control systems. The design was also updated in line with the design of the new design update of the AMG GT road car with the changes being the new headlamps and the grille with the latter providing better protection for the radiator. The front splitter and rear wing were tweaked in order for faster adjustments. The car uses the same 6.2-litre V8 engine as the previous model rather than the 4.0-litre V8 engine of the road car it's the engineers stating the user friendliness and reliability of the engine as the main factor of its retention.

Production and sales

Official US Sales figures for 2019, 2020 and 2021 also include the X290 GT 4-door coupe.

References

Notes

Bibliography

External links

 

Cars introduced in 2014
Coupés
Grand tourers
GT
Roadsters
Sports racing cars
Front mid-engine, rear-wheel-drive vehicles
Vehicles with four-wheel steering
2020s cars